Seascale is a railway station on the Cumbrian Coast Line, which runs between  and . It is owned by Network Rail and managed by Northern Trains.

History

Originally the station had one platform on the inland side of a passing loop in the otherwise single track railway, there was a single siding with a crane and a small building.

The station was renamed in 1866 to Seascale for Gosforth and Wastwater, although there are instances of the older, shorter, name being used in some publications. By 1899 the line had been doubled and the station had two main platforms and a bay, the station building was larger, there was a goods yard to the south east able to accommodate most types of goods including live stock and was equipped with a three-ton crane.

At least one camping coach was positioned here by the London Midland Region from 1955 to 1971, from 1964 to 1969 there were two, including two Pullman type coaches in 1967 only. The station was renamed in 1955 to Seascale.

Facilities
There are train shelters, passenger information displays and seating on each side but the station is not staffed (though it is one of the few mandatory stops on the route); a ticket machine has now been installed by Northern to allow passengers to buy before boarding the train.  Access to the platforms is step-free on both sides, but the low platforms make the station unsuitable for mobility-impaired users without assistance (a Harrington Hump has been installed here to improve accessibility).

The views are of St Bees Head and across the Solway Firth towards southern Scotland (to the north), Seascale village (to the east and south) and the Isle of Man (to the west).

Services

Since the May 2018 timetable change, a basic hourly service (with some shorter intervals) runs through the day until mid-evening.  A Sunday service also now operates (seven northbound, nine southbound) - the first time such a service has run since May 1976.

Notes

References

External links

 
 

Railway stations in Cumbria
DfT Category F2 stations
Former Furness Railway stations
Railway stations in Great Britain opened in 1849
Northern franchise railway stations
1849 establishments in England
Seascale